Densmore is a surname. Notable people with the surname include:

 Frances Densmore (1867-1957), American ethnographer and ethnomusicologist
 James Densmore (1820-1889), American inventor
 John Densmore (born 1944), American musician and songwriter, drummer of The Doors
 Orin Densmore (1895-1872), American businessman and farmer
 William Densmore (1843-1865), Union Navy sailor in the American Civil War and Medal of Honor recipient

Given name
 Densmore Maxon (1820-1887), American farmer, Democratic member of the Wisconsin State Assembly and the Wisconsin State Senate

Fictional
 Ollie Densmore, fictional character

Other 
 Densmore, Kansas, unincorporated community in Norton County, Kansas, US
 Densmore Mills, Nova Scotia, small community in Nova Scotia, Canada
 Densmore and LeClear, architecture firm based in Boston, Massachusetts, US, active from 1897 through 1942
 Densmore Methodist Church of the Thousand Islands, Methodist church located at Alexandria, New York, US